The Borel-Odier Bo-T (also known as the Borel-Odier torpedo floatplane or B.O.2) was a French twin-engined float biplane designed by Borel but built by Antoine Odier for the French Navy.

Design and development
The Bo-T was a biplane powered by two 164 kW (220 hp) Hispano-Suiza 8Ba inline piston engines and fitted with twin floats. It had room under the fuselage for a torpedo. The prototype was destroyed on the first flight in August 1916 but the French Navy still placed and order for 91 aircraft. Deliveries did not start until 1917 and were stopped when the Armistice was signed. Only a few aircraft saw operational use on coastal patrols in the mediterranean.

In 1919 a ten-passenger transport variant was flown designated Bo-C/Bo.20 but it was destroyed during testing.

Variants
Bo-T
Torpedo-reconnaissance floatplane
Bo-C
Ten-passenger transport variant of the Bo-T
Bo.19
Three-seat floatplane, powered by 400 hp Liberty engine; never built

Operators

French Navy

Specifications (Bo-T)

See also

References

Bibliography

1910s French bomber aircraft
Floatplanes
Borel aircraft
Biplanes
Aircraft first flown in 1916
Twin piston-engined tractor aircraft